Antonis Katsantonis (c. 1775 – 1808) was a notable Greek klepht who lived in the era before the Greek War of Independence.

Early life
His real name was Antonis Makriyannis (Αντώνης Μακρυγιάννης), son of Yannis Makriyannis (born in Petrovouni, Epirus—not to be confused with Yannis Makriyannis born in Avoriti, Doris).

Klepht
In 1802 he abandoned his life as a shepherd and began participating in raids by klephts; it was then that he acquired the nickname kaçak ("fugitive" in Turkish). During the years 1803-1808, he successfully battled several times against the army of Ali Pasha, the most notable of them being the Battle in the Mount Prosiliako (Μάχη στου Προσηλιάκου) in 1807. He is mentioned as having killed Veli Gega, a member of Ali Pasha's Supreme Council.

Capture and death
In the summer of 1809 Katsantonis is said to have been struck down by a serious illness identified as smallpox, so he appointed his brother Kostas Lepeniotis ( or Kostas from Lepenou) to take over from him as leader of the Agrafa's klephts; according to tradition, when Ali Pasha heard this news, he sent an Ottoman army officer called Mühürdar to arrest Katsantonis in the cave where he was staying and being treated by a doctor called Thanasis Doufekias; eventually, Katsantonis and his second brother, Yorgos Chasiotis ( or Yorgos from Chasia) were captured and were taken to the Pasha, who had them tortured to death. Katsantonis was executed in public by having his bones crushed with a sledgehammer. 

The same tradition states that in 1823 Markos Botsaris avenged the death of Katsantonis by killing Mühürdar at the Battle of Kefalovryso, in Karpenisi.

Cultural impact
His legend had a considerable impact on post-Independence Greek culture, since he has been recognized as one of the people who had prepared the Revolution and had envisioned the ideal of an independent Greek nation, well before the popularization of the corresponding organized ideological Movement in Greece.

Literature
The distinguished poet Aristotelis Valaoritis (1824–1879), member of the literary Heptanese School, wrote a poem called "Ο Κατσαντώνης (άρρωστος)" inspired by the klepht's sickness and death (published in the third quarter of the 19th century).

Shadow play
He has also been featured as a minor character in the popular Greek shadow play Karagiozis along with his legendary opponent in the Battle of 1807, the Turkish Gheg Albanian dervent-ağa ("mountain-gate chief", δερβέναγας in Greek) Veligekas (Βεληγκέκας).

Television
A TV series (docudrama style), in 12 parts, called Chomata me Istoria—hosted by Elias Mamalakis and based on Katsantonis' biography—was broadcast from November 2008 till January 2009 on ERT3 TV.

References
 Dimitrios Papakaryas, Ιστορικά του Φουρνά των Αγράφων [The History of Fourna of Agrafa], Athens, 1992.

External links
 Article on Katsantonis and Lepeniotis by the local history encyclopedia of Evrytania. 

People from Evrytania
Outlaws
1809 deaths
Year of birth missing
Sarakatsani